Irving P. Mehigan (January 15, 1898 – August 4, 1980) was a member of the Wisconsin State Senate from 1924 to 1935.

Biography
Irving P. Mehigan was born on January 15, 1898, in Milwaukee, Wisconsin. He graduated from Marquette Academy and the Marquette Law School in 1923.

Career
Mehigan was elected to the Senate on December 30, 1924, in a special election following the death of Ben H. Mahon. He represented the 9th District from 1924 to 1935. He was a Republican and practiced law in Milwaukee.

Death
Mehigan died of cancer on August 4, 1980.

References

1898 births
1980 deaths
Politicians from Milwaukee
Republican Party Wisconsin state senators
Marquette University Law School alumni
20th-century American politicians